The Sunbury Research Centre -- also known as ICBT Sunbury—is a main research institute of BP in north-east Surrey.

History
It began in 1917 as the Sunbury Research Station. Research began with the employment of two chemists to look into the viscosity of fuel oil for the Navy in the First World War, and the production of toluene. In the 1920s research took place into cracking, at the plant at Uphall in Scotland (West Lothian). The first new building opened in July 1931. 76 staff were there in 1929, 99 in 1934 and 197 in 1939.

By the 1950s, BP Research was in a 39-acre site in Sunbury. Geophysical research had also taken place at Kirklington Hall Research Station in Nottinghamshire, until 1957. Around 1958, the site was expanded with a new Physics laboratory and five other buildings. A Linear electron accelerator was installed. By early 1958, Kirklington Hall had been sold.

Products that the British Petroleum Company made in the 1950s were BP Motor Spirit and BP Energol (visco-static motor oil). But Britain would not produce much oil of its own until the mid-1970s when North Sea oil arrived at the Forties Oil Field.

Construction
Three new buildings were built from 1998 as part of Phase 1. Since 2001, four new buildings were built as part of Phase 2.

Structure
It is situated off the A244 (via the A308) in the north of Sunbury-on-Thames, and Surrey, on the Surrey boundary with London. To the east nearby is Sunbury Common.

The retail division of BP UK is at Witan Gate House. BP employs around 15,000 people in the UK.

It has an enhanced oil recovery laboratory.

See also
 Castrol Technology Centre
 Oil fields operated by BP
 Peter Mather (businessman), Head of BP UK
 National Physical Laboratory (United Kingdom)

References

 The History of the British Petroleum Company, October 1982,

External links
 ICBT Sunbury
 New building

1917 establishments in England
1917 in technology
BP buildings and structures
Chemical industry in the United Kingdom
Chemical research institutes
Energy research institutes
Engineering research institutes
Laboratories in the United Kingdom
Petroleum industry in the United Kingdom
Petroleum organizations
Physics laboratories
Research institutes established in 1917
Research institutes in Surrey
Sunbury-on-Thames